Gremyachinskoye Urban Settlement is a municipal formation (an urban settlement) within Gremyachinsky Municipal District of Perm Krai, Russia, which a part of the territory of the town of krai significance of Gremyachinsk is incorporated as. It is the only urban settlement in the municipal district.

References

Notes

Sources

Urban settlements of Russia
Geography of Perm Krai